Marshin Jefta (born 5 March 1999) is a South African cricketer. He made his first-class debut on 22 February 2021, for Boland in the 2020–21 CSA 3-Day Provincial Cup.

References

External links
 

1999 births
Living people
South African cricketers
Boland cricketers
Place of birth missing (living people)